Ilias Valatas (1915 – 1994) was a Greek sports shooter. He competed in the 50 m rifle event at the 1948 Summer Olympics.

References

External links

1915 births
1994 deaths
Greek male sport shooters
Olympic shooters of Greece
Shooters at the 1948 Summer Olympics
Place of birth missing
20th-century Greek people